Alfred Scott (28 October 1901 – 5 January 1984) was a New Zealand cricketer. He played three first-class matches for Auckland between 1925 and 1928.

See also
 List of Auckland representative cricketers

References

External links
 

1901 births
1984 deaths
New Zealand cricketers
Auckland cricketers
Cricketers from Auckland